was a Buddhist temple and royal mausoleum of the Ryūkyū Kingdom, located in Naha, Okinawa. It was erected during the reign of King Shō Shin (r. 1477–1526), and destroyed in the 1945 battle of Okinawa.

In 1496, memorial tablets representing the kings of the Ryūkyū Kingdom were installed in the temple, establishing it as a royal mausoleum. Anyone entering the temple grounds, including the king himself, had to dismount and enter the temple on foot out of respect for the prior sovereigns. The temple grounds were expanded at this time as well, with the construction of the massive stone gates and walls which remain today. Though these royal memorial tablets continued to be enshrined in the Sōgen-ji for many centuries, beginning in 1521, the actual royal remains were entombed in the Tamaudun mausoleum completed that year a short distance from Shuri Castle.

In the early years, spirit tablet of three royalties were placed here: Shō Shoku, father of King Shō En; Shō Kyū, father of King Shō Hō; and Shō I, father of King Shō Nei. In 1699, Shō Shoku and Shō Kyū's spirit tablet were moved to Tennō-ji, Shō I's was moved to Tenkai-ji.

All the temple buildings were destroyed in the Battle of Okinawa in 1945; only the stone walls and gates, foundations and steps, and some tablets and steles survived. Of two stone tablets erected outside the gates warning visitors to dismount, one remains today. The site is today a public park.

See also 

 Glossary of Japanese Buddhism

References 

Religious buildings and structures completed in 1496
Buddhist temples in Okinawa Prefecture
Buddhist archaeological sites in Japan
Buildings and structures in Japan destroyed during World War II
1945 disestablishments
Buddhism in the Ryukyu Islands
Rinzai temples